Beat 102 103 is an independent regional radio station in the Republic of Ireland licensed by the Broadcasting Commission of Ireland covering counties Waterford, Carlow, Kilkenny, Wexford and Tipperary in South East Ireland. It began broadcasting on 1 July 2003 from studios at The Broadcast Centre, Ardkeen, Waterford City (shared with Waterford station WLR FM), becoming the first station to operate under a regional licence.

The station is a Top 40 Hit/CHR station aimed at listeners aged between 15 and 35.

The main presenters on Beat are Niall Power, Dave Cronin, David Hammond, Darren Rice and Debbie Ridgard.

On 13 April 2007, Cork based Thomas Crosbie Holdings (TCH) announced it had acquired 75% ownership of both Beat 102 103 and WLR FM, in a deal worth a combined €14 million with WLR FM managing director Des Whelan keeping 25% of each. TCH already had a media presence in the South East, owning several newspapers in the region.

Thomas Crosbie Holdings went into receivership in March 2013. The 75% stake was acquired by Landmark Media Investments.

In December 2017, a sale was agreed to The Irish Times pending regulatory approval. In July 2018, the sale of the station to The Irish Times was complete.

A second stream, Noughty Beats, was launched in 2018.

Beat News and Beat Sport
News and Sport bulletins are at 10 to the hour from 06.50 'till 18.50 daily, with a 10-minute Beat News Roundup broadcast at 12.30. At 19.50, 20.50, 21.50, 23.30 and 01.00 on weekdays, "The Juicy Bits", a news, showbiz and weather bulletin is also broadcast.

The News Team 
Dean Egan – News & Sports Editor
Robbie Byrne - Digital Editor
Shaun Connolly - Sports Journalist
Cillian Doyle - Journalist
Megan O'Brien - Journalist

The Sports Team 
Shaun Connolly - Sports Presenter

Station imaging 

Tara Murray is the female station imaging voice and Ben Murray is the male station imaging and promo voice of the station. Beat's sung jingles are by ReelWorld Europe. The station strapline is "Your Music Now".

Frequencies

References

External links
Beat 102–103 Website

Mass media in County Carlow
Mass media in County Kilkenny
Mass media in County Wexford
Mass media in County Tipperary
Mass media in Waterford (city)
Radio stations in the Republic of Ireland